Fatehgarh Nihal is a village in Phillaur in Jalandhar district of Punjab State, India. The village is administrated by Sarpanch an elected representative of the village.

Demography 
, The village has a total number of 26 houses and the population of 142 of which 75 are males while 67 are females.  According to the report published by Census India in 2011, the village does not have any Schedule Caste or Schedule Tribe population so far.

See also
List of villages in India

References

External links 
 Tourism of Punjab
 Census of Punjab

Villages in Jalandhar district